Paul Martin Dahlø (29 August 1885 – 2 May 1967) was a Norwegian politician for the Labour Party.

He was elected to the Norwegian Parliament from Sør-Trøndelag in 1945, and was re-elected on two occasions.  He had previously served as a deputy representative during the terms 1928–1930, 1931–1933 and 1937–1945.

Dahlø was born in Frøya and a member of Sør-Frøya municipality council between 1925 and 1955, except for a period between 1941 and 1945. He served as mayor in the periods 1934–1937, 1937–1941 and 1945–1947.

Outside politics, he was a fisher. He was a member of the board of Norges sildesalslag 1936-1945, Fiskernes samkjøp 1938-1950 and Norges Fiskarlag 1945-1951.

References

1885 births
1967 deaths
Labour Party (Norway) politicians
Members of the Storting
Mayors of Frøya, Sør-Trøndelag
20th-century Norwegian politicians